The 2020 AFC U-23 Championship qualification was an international men's under-23 football competition which decide the participating teams of the 2020 AFC U-23 Championship.

A total of 16 teams qualified to play in the final tournament, including Thailand who qualified automatically as hosts country. These matches also served as the first stage of the AFC qualifiers for the 2020 Summer Olympics men's football tournament in Japan.

Draw
Of the 47 AFC member associations, a total of 44 teams entered the competition. The final tournament hosts Thailand decided to participate in qualification despite having automatically qualified for the final tournament.

The draw was held on 7 November 2018, 15:00 MYT (UTC+8), at the AFC House in Kuala Lumpur, Malaysia. The 44 teams were drawn into eleven groups of four teams. For the draw, teams were divided into two zones:
West Zone: 24 teams from West Asia, Central Asia and South Asia, to be drawn into six groups of four teams (Groups A–F).
East Zone: 20 teams from ASEAN and East Asia, to be drawn into five groups of four teams (Groups G–K).

The teams were seeded according to their performance in the 2018 AFC U-23 Championship final tournament and qualification (overall ranking shown in parentheses; NR stands for non-ranked teams). The following restrictions were also applied:
The eleven teams which indicated their intention to serve as qualification group hosts prior to the draw were drawn into separate groups.

Notes
Teams in bold qualified for the final tournament.
(H): Qualification group hosts
(N): Not a member of the International Olympic Committee, ineligible for Olympics
(Q): Final tournament hosts, automatically qualified regardless of qualification results
(W): Withdrew after draw

Player eligibility
Players born on or after 1 January 1997 are eligible to compete in the tournament.

Format
In each group, teams play each other once at a centralized venue. The eleven group winners and the four best runners-up qualify for the final tournament. If the final tournament hosts Thailand win their group or are among the four best runners-up, the fifth best runner-up also qualifies for the final tournament.

Tiebreakers
Teams are ranked according to points (3 points for a win, 1 point for a draw, 0 points for a loss), and if tied on points, the following tiebreaking criteria are applied, in the order given, to determine the rankings (Regulations Article 9.3).
Points in head-to-head matches among tied teams;
Goal difference in head-to-head matches among tied teams;
Goals scored in head-to-head matches among tied teams;
If more than two teams are tied, and after applying all head-to-head criteria above, a subset of teams are still tied, all head-to-head criteria above are reapplied exclusively to this subset of teams;
Goal difference in all group matches;
Goals scored in all group matches;
Penalty shoot-out if only two teams are tied and they met in the last round of the group;
Disciplinary points (yellow card = 1 point, red card as a result of two yellow cards = 3 points, direct red card = 3 points, yellow card followed by direct red card = 4 points);
Drawing of lots.

Groups
The matches were played between 22 and 26 March 2019.

Group A
All matches were held in Qatar.
Times listed are UTC+3.

Group B
All matches were held in Bahrain.
Times listed are UTC+3.

Group C
All matches were held in Iran.
Times listed are UTC+4:30.

Group D
All matches were held in Saudi Arabia.
Times listed are UTC+3.

Group E
All matches were held in Kuwait.
Times listed are UTC+3.

Group F
All matches were held in Uzbekistan.
Times listed are UTC+5.

Group G
All matches were held in Mongolia.
Times listed are UTC+8.

Group H
All matches were held in Cambodia.
Times listed are UTC+7.

Group I
All matches were held in Myanmar.
Times listed are UTC+6:30.

Group J
All matches were held in Malaysia.
Times listed are UTC+8.

Group K
All matches were held in Vietnam.
Times listed are UTC+7.

Ranking of second-placed teams
Due to groups having different number of teams (after the withdrawal of Pakistan from Group F), the results against the fourth-placed teams in four-team groups were not considered for this ranking.

Qualified teams
The following 16 teams qualified for the 2020 AFC U-23 Championship.

1 Bold indicates champions for that year. Italic indicates hosts for that year.

Goalscorers

References

External links
, the-AFC.com
AFC U-23 Championship 2020, stats.the-AFC.com

Qualification
2020
U-23 Championship qualification
2019 in youth association football
March 2019 sports events in Asia